Nagwan Elzawawi (نجوان الزواوي, born ) was an Egyptian female weightlifter, competing in the 69 kg category and representing Egypt at international competitions. She is a weightlifting coach. 

She participated at the 2000 Summer Olympics in the 69 kg event. She competed at world championships, including the 1998 World Weightlifting Championships.

She is a coach for the  United Arab Emirates team.

Major results

References

External links
 
http://weekly.ahram.org.eg/Archive/1998/403/sp3.htm
http://www.iwf.net/2010/10/06/uae-launches-its-womens-team/
http://www.todor66.com/olim/2000/Weightlifting/Women_under_69kg.html
http://www.todor66.com/weightlifting/World/1998/Women_under_69kg.html
http://religion.blogs.cnn.com/2012/07/22/muslim-olympians-wrestle-with-ramadan-dilemma/comment-page-14/
http://www.nytimes.com/2012/10/24/sports/amid-glares-female-muslim-weightlifters-compete.html

1976 births
Living people
Egyptian female weightlifters
Weightlifters at the 2000 Summer Olympics
Olympic weightlifters of Egypt
Place of birth missing (living people)